Peshawari refers to a person or item that is associated with Peshawar, a major city in Pakistan.

Peshawari may also refer to:
 Peshawari (people), or Hindkowans
 Peshawari chappal, traditional footwear
 Peshawari turban, traditional headwear

People with the surname
 Abdur Rahman Peshawari (1886–1925), Turkish soldier, journalist and diplomat
 Ibrahim Peshawari (1850-1930), Islamic scholar in Bengal
 Uzair Gul Peshawari (1886-1989), Islamic scholar and freedom activist

See also